Adenomera bokermanni is a species of frog in the family Leptodactylidae, the southern frogs. It is endemic to Brazil, where it is a very common frog. It is thought to be a species complex made up of several species grouped under one scientific name.

This frog lives in the leaf litter on the floors of primary and secondary forests. It is adaptable and is sometimes seen in gardens.

References

Adenomera
Endemic fauna of Brazil
Amphibians described in 1973
Taxonomy articles created by Polbot